Hywel ab Owain was a Welsh king of a part of Glywysing from about 990 until his death in 1043.

More information

1043 deaths
Monarchs of Morgannwg
10th-century Welsh monarchs
11th-century Welsh monarchs
Year of birth unknown